Philippine Collective Media Corporation (PCMC; officially known in their documents as Philippine CollectiveMedia Corporation) is a Philippine broadcast media company. Its headquarters are located in Makati, with offices in Fairview, Quezon City and in Tacloban. It owns a number of radio stations under the FMR (Favorite Music Radio) network, as well as its own television station PRTV in Tacloban.

History
PCMC was founded on May 21, 2008, by then Leyte 1st District Representative Martin Romualdez. It was signed into law under Republic Act 9773 in 2009, initially its broadcast operations only limited covering the Eastern Visayas region. PCMC is part of the media companies owned by Romualdez along with newspapers Manila Standard and People's Journal. In the 2010s, PCMC launched 3 stations in Tacloban: AM station DYBR (discontinued in 2013 following the aftermath of Typhoon Haiyan), FM station DYDR, and the first local independent TV station PRTV.

The company's legislative franchise was later amended in 2020 under Republic Act 11508, allowing PCMC to operate national broadcast albeit without President Rodrigo Duterte's signature as the bill lapsed into law after 30 days of inaction. PCMC launched its own FM network Favorite Music Radio (or FMR, based on the owner's initials), with its flagship station DYDR in Tacloban was relaunched under the said brand. PCMC is expected to expand the FMR network into 35 radio stations nationwide.

In May 2021, PCMC and Prime Media Holdings (PMHI/PRIM), a publicly-traded investment firm tied to the Romualdez family with its businesses involving real estate and hospitality, signed a share-for-share swap agreement through a backdoor listing. Under the deal, PCMC shareholders will exchange their shares of common stock to take majority control of PRIM, which will acquire PCMC and will become the latter's subsidiary.

With the expansion of its radio and television operations, the company is expected to launch a national TV network with its plans to collaborate with several content providers (among them is ABS-CBN Corporation, in which Romualdez was one of the 70 representatives who voted to deny the said broadcaster's franchise renewal).

On September 20, 2021, PCMC was signed by ZOE Broadcasting Network an affiliation deal to air A2Z's programming on PRTV Tacloban, As a result, PRTV Tacloban became a network-affiliated station for the first time in its history.

PCMC stations

Television
Analog

Digital

UHF Channel 50 (689.143 MHz)

Digital affiliate stations

Radio
Source: 

Affiliates

Former/inactive stations

References

Mass media companies of the Philippines
Television networks in the Philippines
Philippine radio networks
Philippine companies established in 2008
Mass media companies established in 2008
Mass media in Tacloban
Companies based in Makati
Privately held companies of the Philippines